Q'asa Pata (Quechua q'asa mountain pass, pata step, bank of a river, "mountain pass step" or "mountain pass bank", also spelled Ccasapata, Qasa Pata) is an archaeological site in Peru. It was declared a National Cultural Heritage in 2003. Q'asa Pata lies in the Ayacucho Region, Lucanas Province, Aucará District.

References 

Archaeological sites in Peru
Archaeological sites in Ayacucho Region